Lloyd P. Hines is a Canadian politician, who was elected to the Nova Scotia House of Assembly in the 2013 provincial election. A member of the Nova Scotia Liberal Party, he represented the electoral district of Guysborough–Eastern Shore–Tracadie until 2021.

Prior to his election to the legislature, Hines was a warden of Municipality of the District of Guysborough.

On July 24, 2015, Hines was appointed to the Executive Council of Nova Scotia as Minister of Natural Resources.

In April 2017, Nova Scotia's Office of the Ombudsman published a report that criticized senior officials of the Municipality of the District of Guysborough, including former warden Hines, for their "indulgent" spending and "opportunistic" practices. The report noted that Hines had used his corporate credit card for thousands of dollars in personal purchases and cash advances. Although Hines repaid all the charges, the Ombudsman found that he had benefited by essentially using cash advances from the municipality as short-term loans to cover expenses.

The report also noted that there was insufficient documentation of the purpose of expensed meals, which were often above standard per diem rates and included alcohol, even when the only attendees were council members or administrators such as Hines. Hines defended the higher rates and the expensing of alcohol, telling the Ombudsman that the costs and alcohol were often standard when municipality officials hosted guests with more expensive tastes that they wanted to persuade to invest in the community.

Hines was re-elected in the 2017 election, although his margin of victory of 71 votes was thin enough that the Progressive Conservatives sought a judicial recount, which confirmed the result.

On June 15, 2017, premier Stephen McNeil shuffled his cabinet, moving Hines to Minister of Transportation and Infrastructure Renewal. In October 2017, Hines indicated his support for the renewal of Bay Ferries to continue operating "The Cat" ferry between Yarmouth, Nova Scotia and Portland, Maine, citing the ridership increases in the past year despite engine problems.

Hines came under fire in February 2019 after a media scrum where he failed to disclose any information about the Yarmouth-Maine Ferry contract which he is responsible for.

Electoral record

 

 

 

 

|-

|Liberal
|Lloyd Hines
|align="right"|2,876
|align="right"|39.99
|align="right"|N/A
|-

|New Democratic Party
|Jim Boudreau
|align="right"|2,368
|align="right"|32.93
|align="right"|N/A
|-

|Progressive Conservative
|Neil Decoff
|align="right"|1,947
|align="right"|27.08
|align="right"|N/A
|}

References

Year of birth missing (living people)
Living people
Members of the Executive Council of Nova Scotia
Nova Scotia Liberal Party MLAs
People from Guysborough County, Nova Scotia
Nova Scotia municipal councillors
21st-century Canadian politicians